Bulbogamasidae is a family of mites belonging to the order Mesostigmata.

Genera:
 Bulbogamasus Gu, Wang & Duan, 1991
 Mirabulbus Liu & Ma, 2001

References

Acari